Japan is home to nine forest ecoregions, which reflect its climate and geography. The islands that constitute Japan generally have a humid climate, which ranges from warm subtropical in the southern islands to cool temperate on the northern island of Hokkaidō.

Ecoregions overview
Japan lies at the convergence of three terrestrial realms, the Palearctic, Indomalaya, and Oceania, and its flora and fauna combine elements from all three. The ecoregions that cover the main islands of Japan, Honshū, Hokkaidō, Kyūshū, and Shikoku, along with the nearby islands, are considered part of the Palearctic realm. The island arcs of southern Japan, the Ryukyu Islands to the southwest and the Ogasawara Islands to the southeast, are home to subtropical moist broadleaf forest ecoregions; the Nansei Islands subtropical evergreen forests ecoregion is part of the Indomalayan realm, while the Ogasawara subtropical moist forests of the Ogasawaras is part of the Oceanian realm.

Terrestrial ecoregions
Tropical and subtropical moist broadleaf forests
Nansei Islands subtropical evergreen forests
Ogasawara subtropical moist forests

Temperate broadleaf and mixed forests
Hokkaidō deciduous forests
Nihonkai evergreen forests
Nihonkai montane deciduous forests
Taiheiyo evergreen forests
Taiheiyo montane deciduous forests

Temperate coniferous forests
Hokkaidō montane conifer forests
Honshū alpine conifer forests

Freshwater ecoregions
 Sakhalin, Hokkaido, & Sikhote-Alin Coast
 Lake Biwa
 Honshu-Shikoku-Kyushu
 Ogasarawa Islands - Kazan Archipelago

Marine ecoregions
Not a complete list
 Sea of Japan
 Sea of Okhotsk
 East China Sea
 Kuroshio Current
 Oyashio Current
 Ryukyu reefs
 Ogasawara reefs

References
 Abell, R., M. Thieme, C. Revenga, M. Bryer, M. Kottelat, N. Bogutskaya, B. Coad, N. Mandrak, S. Contreras-Balderas, W. Bussing, M. L. J. Stiassny, P. Skelton, G. R. Allen, P. Unmack, A. Naseka, R. Ng, N. Sindorf, J. Robertson, E. Armijo, J. Higgins, T. J. Heibel, E. Wikramanayake, D. Olson, H. L. Lopez, R. E. d. Reis, J. G. Lundberg, M. H. Sabaj Perez, and P. Petry. (2008). Freshwater ecoregions of the world: A new map of biogeographic units for freshwater biodiversity conservation. BioScience 58:403-414, .

 
Japan
ecoregions